Carthago is a town in northeastern Sudan. It is located in the country's Red Sea state.

Transport
The town is served by Carthago Airport.

Populated places in Red Sea (state)

See also 

 Irgun and Lehi internment in Africa